Lisa Setiawati (born 4 September 1989) is an Indonesian weightlifter.

She won a medal at the 2019 World Weightlifting Championships.

References

External links

1989 births
Living people
Indonesian female weightlifters
World Weightlifting Championships medalists
Competitors at the 2019 Southeast Asian Games
Southeast Asian Games medalists in weightlifting
Southeast Asian Games silver medalists for Indonesia
20th-century Indonesian women
21st-century Indonesian women